Kathy Taylor may refer to:
 Kathy Taylor (politician)
 Kathy Taylor (musician)

See also
 Kathy Tayler, British television presenter and former champion modern pentathlete.
 Catherine Taylor (disambiguation)